Forward pipetting is a technique to dispense a measured quantity of liquid by means of air displacement pipette. The technique is mainly recommended for aqueous solutions, such as buffers, or diluted acids or alkalis. In case of solutions with a high viscosity or a tendency to foam, reverse pipetting is more suitable.

How it works 

In forward pipetting, an exactly set volume of liquid is aspired to the tip and then it is delivered to a new vessel. This is achieved by creating vacuum by means of  the vertical travel of a metal or ceramic piston within an airtight sleeve. As the piston moves upward, driven by the depression of the plunger, a vacuum is created in the space left vacant by the piston. Air from the tip rises to fill the space left vacant, and the tip air is then replaced by the liquid, which is drawn up into the tip and thus available for transport and dispensing elsewhere.
When the pipette knob is pressed on an air displacement pipette, the piston inside the instrument moves down to let air out. Air is displaced by the piston. The volume of air displaced is equivalent to the volume of liquid aspirated.
These pipettes are capable of being very precise and accurate. However, since they rely on air displacement, they are subject to inaccuracies caused by the changing environment, particularly temperature and user technique. For these reasons, this equipment must be carefully maintained and calibrated, and users must be trained to exercise correct and consistent technique.
Alternative solutions to improve reproducibility and accuracy of manual pipetting operations are based on liquid handling robots capable of handling air displacement pipettes.

Technique

Forward pipetting 
The standard forward pipetting technique is used to dispense and mix a sample or reagent into another liquid

Pipetting of heterogeneous samples 
When prerinsing tip is not possible and the full sample must be dispensed for correct analysis, the following alternative of forward pipetting is preferred. Indeed this technique is used for pipetting heterogeneous samples, such as blood or serum.

References

Sources 
Guide to pipetting
Wikilectures: Pipettors

External links 
Gilson website
Andrew Alliance website
Rainin website
Thermo Scientific
Socorex
Biohit
INTEGRA Biosciences

See also
Automated pipetting system
Liquid handling robot
Pipette
Air displacement pipette
Reverse pipetting

Laboratory equipment